John P. Tomaini (July 19, 1902 – July 21, 1985) was an American professional football player who played in the National Football League (NFL) for the Orange Tornadoes in 1929, the Newark Tornadoes in 1930, and the Brooklyn Dodgers from 1930 to 1931. Tomaini played in a total of 35 career games while making 21 starts. 

His brother Army Tomaini also played professional football.

References

1902 births
1985 deaths
Brooklyn Dodgers (NFL) players
Orange Tornadoes players
Newark Tornadoes players
Georgetown Hoyas football players
Players of American football from New Jersey
Sportspeople from Long Branch, New Jersey
Asbury Park High School alumni
Long Branch High School alumni